1838 in philosophy

Events 
 May 21 - The People's Charter is drawn up in the United Kingdom, demanding universal suffrage
 July 15 - Ralph Waldo Emerson delivers the "Divinity School Address" at Harvard University
 University of Belgrade Faculty of Philosophy founded

Publications 
 Jacques Boucher de Crèvecœur de Perthes, De La Création, Essai sur L'Origine et la Progression des Êtres, 1st part
 S. D. Poisson, Recherches sur la probabilité des jugements en matière criminelle et en matière civile

Births 
 January 16 - Franz Brentano (died 1917) 
 February 16 - Henry Adams (died 1918)
 February 18 - Ernst Mach (died 1916)
 March 14 - Robert Flint (died 1910)
 September 2 - Bhaktivinoda Thakur (died 1914)
 December 20 - Edwin Abbott Abbott (died 1926)

Deaths 
 March 13 - Poul Martin Møller (born 1794)

References 

Philosophy
Philosophy by year
19th-century philosophy